The seventh season of the American fictional drama television series ER first aired on October 12, 2000, and concluded on May 17, 2001.  The seventh season consists of 22 episodes.

Plot
In the midst of being remodeled, for a more open, safe floorplan, the show's seventh season starts with John Carter completing his drug rehabilitation and trying to be who he was before he got stabbed, with the support of Abby Lockhart. Abby's own life is in disarray after she is forced to drop out of medical school, her bipolar mother Maggie Wyczenski comes to stay, her new romance with Luka Kovač hits many pitfalls, and she reaches a crossroads in her Nurse position at County. Tragedy ensues when Mark Greene is diagnosed with terminal cancer, giving him only weeks to live. Kerry Weaver also has some issues of her own as she deals with her new lifestyle. Benton tries to find a new spot at County. Not wanting to upset Elizabeth Cordaywho is caught up in a malpractice suitMark keeps his illness a secret. After successful surgery, he proposes to her and she is heavily pregnant when they get married. In the 150th episode of ER, a massive train wreck mobilizes the ER doctors and nurses to the scene.

Cast

Main cast
 Anthony Edwards as Dr. Mark Greene – Attending Physician
 Noah Wyle as Dr. John Carter – Resident PGY-5
 Laura Innes as Dr. Kerry Weaver – Chief of Emergency Medicine
 Alex Kingston as Dr. Elizabeth Corday – Associate Chief of Surgery
 Paul McCrane as  Dr. Robert Romano – Chief of Staff and Surgery
 Goran Visnjic as Dr. Luka Kovač – Attending Physician
 Maura Tierney as Nurse Abby Lockhart
 Michael Michele as Dr. Cleo Finch – Pediatric Emergency Medicine Fellow
 Erik Palladino as Dr. Dave Malucci – Resident PGY-3
 Ming-Na as Dr. Jing-Mei Chen – Resident PGY-4
 Eriq La Salle as Dr. Peter Benton – Surgical Attending Physician

Supporting cast

Doctors and Medical students
 Sam Anderson as Dr. Jack Kayson – Chief of Cardiology
 Amy Aquino as Dr. Janet Coburn – Chief of Obstetrics and Gynecology
 John Aylward as Dr. Donald Anspaugh – Surgical Attending Physician and Hospital Board Member
 Elizabeth Mitchell as Dr. Kim Legaspi – Psychiatrist
 David Brisbin as Dr. Alexander Babcock – Anesthesiologist
 John Doman as Dr. Carl DeRaad – Chief of Psychiatry
Megan Cole as Dr. Alice Upton – Pathologist
 Christopher John Fields as Dr. Phil Tobiason
 Iqbal Theba as Dr. Zagerby – Ophthalmologist

Nurses
 Ellen Crawford as Nurse Lydia Wright
Conni Marie Brazelton as Nurse Conni Oligario
 Deezer D as Nurse Malik McGrath
 Laura Cerón as Nurse Chuny Marquez
 Yvette Freeman as Nurse Manager Haleh Adams
 Lily Mariye as Nurse Lily Jarvik
 Gedde Watanabe as Nurse Yosh Takata
 Dinah Lenney as Nurse Shirley
 Kyle Richards as Nurse Dori Kerns
 Lucy Rodriguez as Nurse Bjerke
 Morris Chestnut as ICU Nurse Frank 'Rambo' Bacon
 Elizabeth Rodriguez as Nurse Sandra
 Mary Heiss as Nurse Mary

Staff, Paramedics and Officers
 Troy Evans as Desk Clerk Frank Martin
 Kristin Minter as Desk Clerk Miranda "Randi" Fronczak
Pamela Sinha as Desk Clerk Amira
 Erica Gimpel as Social Worker Adele Newman
 Skip Stellrecht as Chaplain Miller
Emily Wagner as Paramedic Doris Pickman
 Montae Russell as Paramedic Dwight Zadro
Lynn A. Henderson as Paramedic Pamela Olbes
 Demetrius Navarro as Paramedic Morales
Brian Lester as Paramedic Brian Dumar
Michelle Bonilla as Paramedic Christine Harms
 Claudine Claudio as Paramedic Silva
 Meg Thalken as Chopper EMT Dee McManus
 Ed Lauter as Fire Captain Dannaker
 Chad McKnight as Officer Wilson
 David Roberson as Officer Durcy
 Joe Basile as Officer Tom Bennini

Family
 Frances Sternhagen as Millicent Carter
 Jonathan Scarfe as Chase Carter
 George Plimpton as Grandpa Carter
 Sally Field as Maggie Wyczenski
 Mark Valley as Richard Lockhart
 Nancy Kwan as Mrs. Chen
 Christine Harnos as Jennifer Simon
 Khandi Alexander as Jackie Robbins
 Andrew McFarlane as Jesse Robbins
 Lisa Nicole Carson as Carla Simmons
 Victor Williams as Roger McGrath
Matthew Watkins as Reese Benton
 Paul Freeman as Dr. Charles Corday
 Judy Parfitt as Isabelle Corday

Notable guest stars
 Wentworth Miller as Mike Palmieri
 Alan Dale as Al Patterson
 Chris Sarandon as Dr. Burke (New York)
 James Cromwell as Bishop Lionel Stewart
 Zachery Ty Bryan as Upsilon Psi Lambda Frat Brother
 Lourdes Benedicto as Rena Trujillo
 Jim Belushi as Dan Harris
 Jared Padalecki as Paul Harris
 Jeffrey Dean Morgan as Larkin
 Eric Stonestreet as Willie
 Josh Peck as Nick Stevens

Production
Original executive producers John Wells and Michael Crichton reprised their roles. Sixth season co-executive producers Neal Baer and Jack Orman were promoted to executive producers for the seventh season. Baer left the crew mid-season. Previous executive producer Christopher Chulack remained a consulting producer while working on Wells' Third Watch. Meredith Stiehm joined the crew as a co-executive producer mid-season.

R. Scott Gemmill returned as supervising producer and was joined by new supervising producer Dee Johnson. Long-time crew member Joe Sachs joined the production team as a co-producer for the seventh season and was promoted to producer mid-season. Wendy Spence Rosato and Richard Thorpe returned as producers. Jonathan Kaplan began the seventh season as a consulting producer but returned to his previous role as producer mid-season. Regular director Christopher Misiano joined the crew as a producer for the seventh season only. Michael Salamunovich returned as a co-producer and Teresa Salamunovich continued in her role as associate producer until the mid-season break.

Wells wrote two further episodes. Orman was the series' most prolific writer with seven episodes. Baer contributed a single episode. Gemmill wrote four further episodes and new producers Johnson and Stiehm each wrote three episodes. Sachs wrote a further episode. Former producer Walon Green wrote a single episode. Tom Garrigus joined the writing staff as an executive story editor and contributed to two episodes but left the crew with the close of the season. New writer Elizabeth Hunter contributed a single episode.

Producers Kaplan, Thorpe, and Misiano served as the seasons regular directors. Kaplan helmed six episodes while Thorpe and Misiano directed three each. Chulack directed a further episode. Returning directors were executive producer John Wells, cast members Anthony Edwards and Laura Innes, series veterans Lesli Linka Glatter, Félix Enríquez Alcalá, David Nutter, Marita Grabiak, and Tom Moore. Guy Norman Bee was the season's only new director.

Episodes

References

External links 

Bipolar disorder in fiction
Works about the Croatian War of Independence
2000 American television seasons
2001 American television seasons
ER (TV series) seasons